Patrick Hoguet (23 May 1940 – 27 February 2021) was a French politician.

Biography
Patrick was the son of politician . He was a member of the Union for French Democracy and was elected to the French National Assembly to represent Eure-et-Loir's 3rd constituency, serving from 1993 to 1997 and again from 2002 to 2003. He was also General Councillor for the Canton of Nogent-le-Rotrou.

Patrick Hoguet died in Nogent-le-Rotrou on 27 February 2021 at the age of 80.

Works
Paul Deschanel. Au-delà de la chute du train. Vrai-faux entretien avec le président héraut de la République (2013)
1914-1918 - Les relations complexes entre l'autorité politique et les militaires, Actes du colloque du 3 octobre 2015 à Nogent-le-Rotrou (2017)

References

1940 births
2021 deaths
20th-century French politicians
Union for French Democracy politicians
Union for a Popular Movement politicians
Deputies of the 10th National Assembly of the French Fifth Republic
Deputies of the 12th National Assembly of the French Fifth Republic
People from Sarthe